Presidential elections were held in Chile in 1915. They were a bitter contest between Juan Luis Sanfuentes — a Coalition candidate of the Liberal Party and Conservative Party — and Javier Ángel Figueroa — supported by the Liberal Alliance parties. Sanfuentes beat Figueroa by a single vote in the electoral vote, with numerous allegations of fraud and electoral intervention. Due to the controversy, the National Congress made a contingent vote, which Sanfuentes won by 77 votes to 41.

Results

References

Presidential elections in Chile
1915 in Chile
Chile
Election and referendum articles with incomplete results